Blunk is a surname. Notable people with the surname include:

J. B. Blunk (1926–2002), American sculptor
Krista Blunk, American radio sports announcer
Megan Blunk (born 1989), American wheelchair basketball player
Wilhelm Blunk (1902–1975), German footballer